Sofia Alexandra Völker (born 1989) is a Swedish politician and member of the Riksdag, the national legislature. A member of the Social Democratic Party, she has represented Stockholm County since September 2014.

Völker is the daughter of engineer Per Völker and psychotherapist Marie Lundman Völker. She has a bachelor's degree in politics and a doctorate in political science from Stockholm University. She has been a member of the municipal council in Sundbyberg Municipality since 2014.

References

1989 births
Living people
Members of the Riksdag 2014–2018
Members of the Riksdag 2018–2022
Members of the Riksdag 2022–2026
Members of the Riksdag from the Social Democrats
People from Sundbyberg Municipality
Stockholm University alumni
Women members of the Riksdag
21st-century Swedish women politicians